The Sampit River or Mentaya River is a river of Central Kalimantan, Borneo, Indonesia. The river takes its name from the town of Sampit which lies on the river not far from the Java Sea. Near the mouth of the river is a noted beach park named "Pandaran Beach".

Geography 
The river flows in the midsouthern area of Borneo island with predominantly tropical rainforest climate (designated as Af in the Köppen-Geiger climate classification). The annual average temperature in the area is 23 °C. The warmest month is July, when the average temperature is around 25 °C, and the coldest is November, at 22 °C. The average annual rainfall is 2991 mm. The wettest month is December, with an average of 476 mm rainfall, and the driest is September, with 82 mm rainfall.

See also
List of rivers of Indonesia
List of rivers of Kalimantan

References

Rivers of Central Kalimantan
Rivers of Indonesia